Zygopetalum maculatum is a species of orchid native to Peru, Bolivia and Brazil.

Description

Successfully pollinated flowers close slightly to indicate pollination. Pollinated flowers remain healthy and colorful for up to three months, but unpollinated flowers wilt after one month.

References

External links
 

maculatum